The 2013–14 season of the Libyan Premier League is the forty-fourth edition of the country's top level association footballleague since its inception in 1963. It is the first officially recognised domestic competition since the end of the Libyan Civil War in 2011. Several previous attempts had been made to restart the domestic campaign, though these were thwarted by continuing security concerns and general unrest throughout the country.  The Libyan Football Federation (LFF) therefore agreed to try a one-off campaign to assess the viability of future domestic competition, with the 16 teams participating the same as those who had started the previous campaign back in 2010.

The season started on 27 September 2013. In contrast to the previous season, the league is divided into two groups.

Teams

Team summaries

Regular season

Group A

Group B

Championship round

References

External links
Season at soccerway.com

Libyan Premier League seasons
Libyan Premier League
1